This is a list of the state institutions of Cambodia.

Royalty

King of Cambodia
 Queen Mother Norodom Monineath Sihanouk
 King Norodom Sihamoni
 Norodom Ranariddh

Legislative branch
Parliament of Cambodia
National Assembly of Cambodia
Senate of Cambodia

Executive branch

Prime Minister of Cambodia
 Hun Sen 1998-

Office of the Council of Ministers
 Khmer Rouge Trial Task Force

Ministry of Agriculture, Forestry and Fisheries

Ministry of Commerce

Ministry of Culture and Fine Arts
 APSARA

Ministry of Education, Youth and Sport
National universities:
Cambodia Agricultural Research and Development Institute (CARDI)
Economics and Finance Institute (EFI)
Institute of Technology of Cambodia (ITC)
Moharishi Vedic University (MVU)
National Institute of Education (NIE)
National Polytechnic Institute of Cambodia (NPIC)
National University of Management (NUM)
Prek Leap National School of Agriculture (PNSA)
Royal University of Agriculture (RUA)
Royal University of Fine Arts (RUFA)
Royal University of Law and Economic (RULE)
Royal University of Phnom Penh (RUPP)
Svay Rieng University (SRU)
University of Health Science (UHS)

Ministry of Environment
 Ministry of Environment, Cambodia

Ministry of Finance and Economy
National Bank of Cambodia

Ministry of Foreign Affairs and International Cooperation
 Permanent Mission of the Kingdom of Cambodia to the United Nations

Ministry of Health
National Centre for HIV/AIDS Dermatology and STDs, Cambodia
National Malaria Center of Cambodia
National hospitals
National Pediatric Hospital, Cambodia

Ministry of Information

Ministry of Industry, Mining and Energy
 Electricity Authority of Cambodia
 Cambodia National Petroleum Authority

Ministry of the Interior

Ministry of Justice

Ministry of Labor and Vocational Training

Ministry of Land Management, Urban Planning and Construction
 Council of Land Policy
 National Cadastral Commission
 National Social Land Concession Committee

Ministry of National Defence
 Royal Cambodian Armed Forces
 Royal Cambodian Army
 Royal Cambodian Navy
 Royal Cambodian Air Force

Ministry of Parliamentary Affairs and Inspection

Ministry of Planning
 National Institute of Statistics

Ministry of Posts and Telecommunications
 Camnet Internet Service
 National Information Communications Technology Development Authority, Cambodia
 Telecom Cambodia

Ministry of Public Works and Transport
 Secretariat of Civil Aviation
 Sihanoukville Autonomous Port

Ministry of Religions and Cults
 Buddhist Institute

Ministry of Rural Development

Ministry of Social Affairs, Veteran and Youth Rehabilitation

Ministry of Tourism
 Ministry of Tourism

Ministry of Water Resources and Meteorology

Ministry of Women's Affairs

Judicial branch
 Extraordinary Chambers in the Courts of Cambodia
 Supreme Court of Cambodia

Provincial
Please see Provinces of Cambodia, Districts of Cambodia, Commune council.

See also
 Government of Cambodia
 Politics of Cambodia

References
See Government of Cambodia ministry listings

Government of Cambodia
Politics of Cambodia